Bamshore is a village in Bhatar CD Block in Bardhaman Sadar North subdivision  of Purba Bardhaman district in West Bengal, India.

Geography
It is  30 km away from Bardhaman. It has a post office. In this village there are two mosques and three mandirs.

Demographics
As per the 2011 Census of India Bamshor had a total population of 7,997 of which 4,097 (51%) were males and 3,900 (49%) were females. Population below 6 years was 988. The total number of literates in Bamshor was 5,082 (72.51% of the population over 6 years).

Most of the people are from the Muslim community. A few people belong to the Hindu community. They are from different castes. Some are Sunri, Muchi, Ugra Kshatriya and so on.  Most of the people of this village are cultivators.

Transport
It is situated at the side of  Bardhaman -Baharampur that is Badshahi Road.

Education
It has a higher secondary school - Bamshore High School near Bhatar and two primary schools.

References

Villages in Purba Bardhaman district